The PSL Goalkeeper of the Season in South African football is awarded to the most outstanding goalkeeper of the season.

References 

Premier Soccer League trophies and awards